The 24th annual Berlin International Film Festival was held from 21 June – 2 July 1974. The Golden Bear was awarded to the Canadian film The Apprenticeship of Duddy Kravitz directed by Ted Kotcheff.

Jury
The following people were announced as being on the jury for the festival:
 Rodolfo Kuhn, director and screenwriter (Argentina) - Jury President
 Margaret Hinxmann, writer and film critic (United Kingdom)
 Pietro Bianchi, journalist and film critic (Italy)
 Gérard Ducaux-Rupp, producer (France)
 Kurt Heinz, composer (West Germany)
 Akira Iwasaki, historian and film critic (Japan)
 Arthur Knight, historian and film critic (United States)
 Manfred Purzer, director and screenwriter (West Germany)
 Piet Ruivenkamp, film critic (Netherlands)

Films in competition
The following films were in competition for the Golden Bear award:

Out of competition
 С тобой и без тебя S toboy i bez tebya, directed by Rodion Nahapetov (Soviet Union)

Key
{| class="wikitable" width="550" colspan="1"
| style="background:#FFDEAD;" align="center"| †
|Winner of the main award for best film in its section
|}

Awards
The following prizes were awarded by the Jury:
 Golden Bear: The Apprenticeship of Duddy Kravitz by Ted Kotcheff
 Silver Bear – Special Jury Prize: L'horloger de Saint-Paul by Bertrand Tavernier
 Silver Bear:
 Pane e cioccolata by Franco Brusati
 Tabiate bijan by Sohrab Shahid-Saless
 Little Malcolm by Stuart Cooper
 Im Namen des Volkes by Ottokar Runze
 La Patagonia rebelde by Héctor Olivera
FIPRESCI Award
Still Life by Sohrab Shahid-Saless

References

External links
24th Berlin International Film Festival 1974
1974 Berlin International Film Festival
Berlin International Film Festival:1974 at Internet Movie Database

24
1974 film festivals
1974 in West Germany
1970s in West Berlin